The 2009 Italian GP2 Round was the ninth And penultimate round of the 2009 GP2 Series season. It was held on September 12 and 13, 2009 at Circuit Monza at Monza, Italy. The race was used as a support race to the 2009 Italian Grand Prix.

Report

Background 
The race also saw the return of PartyPokerRacing.com Scuderia Coloni after their court order was dropped. However, Durango withdrew from the event, meaning there were only 12 teams present at Monza, just like at the previous round at Spa. Johnny Cecotto Jr. made his debut for DPR.

Qualifying 
Vitaly Petrov achieved the first pole position in his GP2 Series career. Both Racing Engineering drivers were given 10 place grid penalties after causing avoidable accidents in Spa.

Feature Race 
The Feature Race was action packed, with a very wet track and terrible conditions, the race started behind the safety car. Giedo van der Garde got his and iSport International their first feature win of the season. He passed long time leader Vitaly Petrov for the lead two laps from the end.

Sprint Race 
The Sprint Race was less thrilling, but crashes were still common, as on the first lap Dani Clos flipped his car after being hit side on. Luiz Razia won his first ever GP2 Race and PartyPokerRacing.com Scuderia Coloni's first win in only their second round. The Round was lucky for Razia as Álvaro Parente was penalised after the race, putting him down to eleventh and moving Razia up to 8th, to claim his first GP2 points finish and first pole. After starting from a lucky pole, Razia never looked challenged and finished ahead of the good starting Lucas di Grassi and new champion Nico Hülkenberg. Hülkenberg became 2009 GP2 Series season champion after Vitaly Petrov did not score enough points to keep his championship challenge alive.

Standings after the round 

Drivers' Championship standings

Teams' Championship standings

 Note: Only the top five positions are included for both sets of standings.

Notes

GP2 round
Monza